The Southern Indiana Screaming Eagles men's basketball statistical leaders are individual statistical leaders of the Southern Indiana Screaming Eagles men's basketball program in various categories, including points, assists, blocks, rebounds, and steals. Within those areas, the lists identify single-game, single-season, and career leaders. The Screaming Eagles represent the University of Southern Indiana in the NCAA's Ohio Valley Conference.

Southern Indiana began competing in intercollegiate basketball in 1970.  The NCAA did not officially record assists as a stat until the 1983–84 season, and blocks and steals until the 1985–86 season, but Southern Indiana's record books includes players in these stats before these seasons. These lists are updated through the end of the 2021–22 season.

Scoring

Rebounds

Assists

Steals

Blocks

References

Lists of college basketball statistical leaders by team
Statistical